Oye Motti is a 2021 Pakistani anthology  series that aired on Express Entertainment from 11 February 2021. It is produced by Syed Mukhtar Ahmed under the banner of "Gold Bridge Media". The series revolves around the stigma of body shaming specifically related to women in the society.

Episodes

Season 1

Season 2

References

2021 Pakistani television series debuts
Pakistani drama television series
Urdu-language television shows